Freedom of religion in Ukraine refers to the extent to which people in Ukraine are freely able to practice their religious beliefs, taking into account both government policies and societal attitudes toward religious groups. Due to the ongoing Russian military intervention in Ukraine, some regions which are de jure and internationally recognized as parts of Ukraine are administered either by Russia (in the case of Crimea) or by separatist groups (in the cases of Luhansk Oblast and Donetsk Oblast).

Ukraine's laws guarantee the right of religious freedom, and provide a legal framework for the registration of religious groups. Some religious groups have reported difficulties in legally acquiring property (including property previously confiscated by the government of the Soviet Union) due to discriminatory treatment by local government bodies.

Prior to the Russian Revolution, antisemitic laws were enforced in parts of Ukraine controlled by the Russian Empire, and anti-Jewish mob violence was a regular occurrence. Successive revolutionary governments repealed antisemitic legislature, but also conducted anti-religious campaigns, particularly in the 1920s and 1930s. By the 1940s, religious policy in Ukraine shifted, focusing on repressing religious tendencies associated with Ukrainian nationalism while favoring the Russian Orthodox Church, although the state still promoted atheism. During World War II, Jews were massacred by Nazi and Ukrainian nationalist factions, while the Soviet government deported Muslim Crimean Tatars, primarily to Uzbekistan. Religious persecution in the Soviet Union was halted in the 1980s, leading to a religious revival in Ukraine.

The liberalization of religious policies and subsequent collapse of the Soviet Union has also led to an increase of friction between Christian denominations in Ukraine, as dormant grievances (as well as grievances stemming from Soviet favoritism for the Russian Orthodox Church) have become relevant once more. As of 2019, ongoing disputes of jurisdiction between the Ukrainian Orthodox Church – Kyiv Patriarchate and the Ukrainian Orthodox Church Moscow Patriarchate have transformed into disputes between the UOC-MP and the newly canonized Orthodox Church of Ukraine. Communities have been given the opportunity to remain in the UOC-MP or re-affiliate with the OCU, and both the UOC-MP and OCU have accused each other of misconduct in the process of re-affiliation. Far-right Ukrainian nationalist groups such as Freedom have assaulted members of the Moscow Patriarchate and otherwise harassed them.

There have been several instances of violence against Jews in Ukraine since 2013, although as of 2019 watchdog groups have stated that conditions are improving.

Vandalism against religious buildings and monuments is common, with many different denominations affected. Jewish and Roman Catholic buildings were among the most targeted.

In territories not controlled by the government of Ukraine, Jehovah's Witnesses have faced persecution by Russian and separatist authorities. Russian media has also frequently denounced Jehovah's Witnesses and the Kyiv Patriarchate as being "pro-fascist".

Demographics 
According to the October 2019 national survey conducted by the Razumkov Center, an independent public policy think tank, 64.9 percent of respondents self-identify as Orthodox Christian, 9.5 percent Greek Catholic, 1.8 percent Protestant, 1.6 percent Roman Catholic, 0.1 percent Jewish,  and 0.1 percent Muslim. Another 8 percent self-identify as “simply a Christian” and 12.8 percent say they do not belong to any religious group. Small percentages of Buddhists, Hindus, adherents of other religions, and individuals not disclosing their religion make up the rest of the respondents.

Further breakdown of religious groups 
The same Razumkov Center survey breaks down the 64.9 percent identifying as Christian Orthodox as 13.2 percent belonging to the newly-formed Orthodox Church of Ukraine, 7.7 percent Ukrainian Orthodox Church – Kyiv Patriarchate (UOC-KP); 10.6 percent Ukrainian Orthodox Church (Moscow Patriarchate) (UOC-MP), 30.3 percent “just an Orthodox believer;” and 3.1 percent undecided. According to the Ministry of Culture, the UOC-KP has congregations in all oblasts of the country; the largest numbers of UOC-KP followers reside in the western and central regions of the country. The UOC-MP has congregations throughout the country. Most of the UAOC’s congregations are in the western part of the country.

Followers of the Ukrainian Greek Catholic Church, the largest non-Orthodox church with an estimated four million members, reside primarily in the western oblasts of Lviv, Lutsk, Ivano-Frankivsk, and Ternopil. The Roman Catholic Church has an estimated one million members. Most of its congregations are in Lviv, Khmelnytsky, Zhytomyr, Vinnytsya, and Zakarpattya Oblasts.

The Evangelical Baptist Union of Ukraine is the largest Protestant community. Other Christian groups include Pentecostals, Seventh-day Adventists, Lutherans, Anglicans, Calvinists, Methodists, Presbyterians, Jehovah’s Witnesses, and the Church of Jesus Christ of Latter-day Saints.

Government agencies and independent think tanks estimate the Muslim population at 500,000. Some Muslim leaders put the number at two million. According to government figures, the majority are Crimean Tatars, numbering an estimated 300,000.

According to the government census data from 2001, 103,600 Jews live in the country, constituting approximately 0.2 percent of the population. The Association of Jewish Organizations and Communities (VAAD) states there are approximately 300,000 persons of Jewish ancestry in the country.

Territories affected by Russian military intervention 

According to VAAD, before the Russian military intervention in eastern Ukraine, approximately 30,000 Jews lived in the Donbas region. Jewish groups estimate between 10,000 and 15,000 Jewish residents lived in Crimea before Russia’s annexation. There are also Buddhists, practitioners of Falun Gong, followers of the Baháʼí Faith and adherents of the International Society for Krishna Consciousness.

History

Background

The Kievan church 
Christianity, and specifically Byzantine Christianity, was adopted as the state religion of the Kievan Rus' in 988. Following the East–West Schism, the Kievan church remained in the Orthodox sphere. During this time period, Jews and Muslims were also present in the Kievan Rus', although these groups were generally seen as being distinct from ethnic Ukrainians or Rusyns. As the Kievan Rus' disintegrated in the 12th and 13th centuries, the territories corresponding to modern-day Ukraine were subject to various political religious poles of attraction: Russia in the east, Lithuania in the north, and Poland in the west. The Kievan church moved its seat to Moscow, and would split with the Byzantine Church in 1448, eventually completing its independence from Constantinople as the Russian Orthodox Church in 1598. However, former Kievan churches in the Grand Duchy of Lithuania retained their loyalty to Constantinople, and disputed the Russian Church's claim to being the true descendant of the Kievan church. In 1596, the former Kievan churches in Lithuania reunified with the Catholic Church as Eastern Catholic (also known as Uniate) churches).

Khmelnytsky uprising and the Russian Empire 

The Khmelnytsky Uprising in the 17th century against the Polish–Lithuanian Commonwealth led by Ukrainian Cossacks was partly in response to attempts to pressure Orthodox Ukrainians to convert to Catholicism. The conflict saw large amounts of religiously-motivated violence, with the rebel forces targeting Jews and Catholics. As a result of the war, the Russian Empire ended up annexing most ethnically Ukrainian territories. Subsequently, Russian Orthodoxy was promoted, and religious freedom was curtailed. Throughout the 19th and early 20th century, Jews in Ukraine, as well as elsewhere in the Russian Empire, were targeted by pogroms. In 1882, Alexander III of Russia instituted the May Laws, a series of discriminatory laws targeting Jews, which would remain in effect until the Russian Revolution in 1917.

Religion in the early Ukrainian nationalist movement 
In the 18th and 19th century, Ukrainian nationalists agitating for an independent Ukrainian state viewed religious divisions as an obstacle to their national unity, and consciously de-emphasized religious identity in favor of secularism as the foundation of a Ukrainian identity.

Soviet era

Early Soviet Union 
During the Russian Revolution and the ensuing Russian Civil War, pogroms continued to be committed in Ukraine by various factions involved. The Ukrainian People's Republic and Russian Provisional Government abolished antisemitic laws, and in the case of the former Yiddish was adopted as a national language and Jews were represented in government positions.

Following the end of the Russian Civil War, Ukraine became a constituent republic of the Soviet Union. Relative religious freedom continued in the early 1920s, although the government  instituted anti-religious campaigns against religion in general. Harsh repression was implemented in the late 20s and 1930s. Eastern Catholics were targeted for particularly harsh persecution, as the Soviet government was concerned that their ties to the Catholic Church could inspire anti-Soviet support from outside of the country. Evangelical Christians and Baptists were tolerated by Soviet authorities, as they were not viewed as a political threat by the government. Pentecostals, Seventh Day Adventists, Jehovah's Witnesses, and other tiny Protestant sects that were openly opposed to the state were banned outright. Roman Catholics, Jews and Muslims faced persecution.

Ukrainian churches in the early Soviet Union 
For most of the 1920s, the Ukrainian Autocephalous Orthodox Church received some support from the Soviet government, as this church was perceived as a more progressive alternative to the monarchist Russian Orthodox Church. As the Church became associated with Ukrainian nationalism, however, the Soviet government reversed its position, and its leadership was arrested en masse between 1929 and the early 1930s, all but eliminating the church.

Judaism in early Soviet Ukraine 
In the 1920s, anti-religious campaigns targeting Judaism in the Soviet Union were led by the Yevsektsiya, the Jewish section of the Communist Party. These campaigns sought to create a secular identity for ethnic Jews in Soviet society, in contrast to both religious and Zionist identities which were derided by the government as reactionary. As part of this program, the agencies KOMZET and later OZET were established to resettle Jews in agricultural collectives. OZET in particular attempted to resettle Jews in the Crimean peninsula.

In 1930, the Yevsektsiya was dissolved, leaving no central Jewish organization in the Soviet Union, secular or religious.

World War II and aftermath 
During Nazi occupation, hundreds of thousands of Jews were killed by Nazi forces and Ukrainian nationalist groups.

The Ukrainian Church was reestablished under Nazi occupation; its clergy fled the country following the defeat of the German army and the Church once again disappeared inside Ukraine. In 1944, following the capture of Lviv, a center of Ukrainian Eastern Catholicism, Stalin ordered the arrest of clergy that did not convert to Russian Orthodoxy and transferred several thousand Eastern Catholic churches to the Russian Orthodox Church.

Crimean Muslims were subjected to mass deportation in 1944 when Joseph Stalin accused them of collaborating with Nazi Germany. More than 200,000 Crimean Tatars were deported to Central Asia, primarily the Uzbek SSR. It is estimated that more than 100,000 deportees died of starvation or disease due to the deportation. The property and territory abandoned by Crimean Tatars was appropriated by ethnic Russians who were resettled by the Soviet authorities, leading to large demographic changes in Crimea.

Soviet authorities arranged for an Orthodox synod in Lviv in 1946, where it was announced that the Ukrainian Eastern Catholic church had dissolved itself into the Russian Orthodox Church. No actual Eastern Catholic clergy were able to attend this synod as they had already been arrested, and the synod was denounced as a sham by Catholic and Eastern Catholic clergy outside the Soviet Union. According to Eastern Catholic sources, thousands of Eastern Catholics died as a result of persecution, and several thousand more had to serve prison sentences in labor camps.

Following the abolition of Ukraine's national churches, Russian Orthodoxy experienced a resurgence in Ukraine, with more Russian Orthodox churches existing in Ukraine than in Russia itself. Some followers of the national churches privately kept their faith while attending either Roman Catholic or Russian Orthodox services, while others practiced their faith clandestinely.

Glasnost era 
While Soviet campaigns against religion waned in intensity following Stalin's death, the most significant thaw in Soviet attitudes towards religion would not occur until Mikhail Gorbachev's government instituted its glasnost policies in the 1980s, loosening restrictions against religion, freeing political prisoners of conscience and returning some confiscated properties to religious organizations.

In 1989, the Eastern Catholic church resurfaced in Ukraine, with hundreds of parishes across the republic renouncing their affiliation with the Russian Orthodox Church. Later that year, Gorbachev promised that the Soviet government would respect the religious freedom of Eastern Catholics in the Soviet Union. In 1990, the Russian Orthodox Church responded granted its Ukrainian division the title of Ukrainian Orthodox Church and some limited autonomy.

Legacy 
Sociologists have suggested that a contributing factor toward religious tolerance in modern Ukraine is the legacy of a political alliance between religious dissidents of various faiths and secular Ukrainian dissidents in the Soviet Union.

Independent Ukraine 
In 1992, the Ukrainian Eastern Catholic church received formal recognition from the Ukrainian government. However, it received only limited support from the Vatican, which limited its jurisdiction to Western Ukraine and ethnic Ukrainians.

Jews faced renewed antisemitism in the 1990s, although this declined by the end of the decade.

The Russian military intervention in Ukraine in the 2010s has contributed to an increase in religious nationalism in Ukraine and a waning of religious tolerance.

On January 6, 2019, Patriarch Bartholomew I of Constantinople granted autocephaly to the Orthodox Church of Ukraine, canonically recognizing it as separate from the Russian Orthodox Church. United Nations observers reported that the process of transitioning congregations from the UOC-MP to the OCU occasionally led to violence, but that overall it led to "an overall trend of decreasing tensions between religious communities." The UN also expressed concern, however, at the participation of non-religious groups in the process, including local authorities and groups described as far-right. Accusations of far-right groups pressuring congregations to abandon the UOC-MP for the OCU were spread by Russian media. The UOC-MP and OCU have continued to feud over transition processes by which communities decide whether to re-affiliate with the OCU, with both churches alleging misconduct by the other.

On 2 December 2022, Ukrainian President Volodymyr Zelenskyy entered a bill to the Verkhovna Rada that would officially ban all activities of the Ukrainian Orthodox Church (Moscow Patriarchate) UOC in Ukraine.

Legal framework 
The constitution provides for freedom of religion and worship. By law the government may restrict this right only in the “interests of protecting public order, the health and morality of the population, or protecting the rights and freedoms of other persons.” The constitution provides for the separation of church and state. Ukraine has been described as having "relatively decent standards" when it comes to legal protections of religious freedom.

By law the objective of religious policy is to “restore full-fledged dialogue between representatives of various social, ethnic, cultural, and religious groups to foster the creation of a tolerant society and provide for freedom of conscience and worship.”

Government agencies authorized to monitor religious organizations include the Prosecutor General, the Ministry of Internal Affairs, and all other “central bodies of the executive government.”

Religious organization registration 
The law requires a religious institution seeking to receive official status as a legal entity to register both as a religious organization and as a nonprofit organization. To obtain official religious status an organization must register either with the Ministry of Culture, the government agency responsible for religious affairs, or with regional government authorities, depending upon the nature of the organization. Religious centers, administrations, monasteries, religious brotherhoods, missions, and religious schools register with the Ministry of Culture. Religious groups and congregations register with the regional authorities where they operate, either with the city government in Kyiv or the respective oblast government outside of Kyiv. While these religious groups and congregations may form the constituent units of a nationwide religious organization, the nationwide organization does not register on a national basis nor may it obtain recognition as a legal entity; rather, the constituent units register and obtain legal entity status.

Without legal entity status, a religious group may not own property, conduct banking activities, or publish materials. Per the stipulation against national registration, only the registered constituent units of a nationwide religious organization may own property or conduct business activities, either for themselves or on behalf of the nationwide organization. The law grants property tax exemptions to religious organizations and considers them nonprofit organizations.

Only registered religious groups may seek restitution of communal property previously confiscated by the government of the Soviet Union. Religious groups must apply to regional authorities for property restitution. The law states consideration of a restitution claim should be completed within a month. All major religious organizations have appealed the government to establish a more transparent process for addressing property restitution, and have complained that the process often takes longer than the month proscribed by law.

Eligibility requirements 
To be eligible for registration, a religious group must have at least 10 adult members and must submit its statutes to the registration authorities. To obtain status as a nonprofit organization, a religious group must register with the Ministry of Justice, which is responsible for maintaining the government’s register of legal entities. This register lists all entities with this status, including religious ones. The law does not specify which of the two registration procedures must be undertaken first.

Religious organizations and the military and prisons 
The law requires commanders of military units to allow their subordinates to participate in religious services but bans the creation of religious organizations in military institutions and military units. The Ministry of Defense defines selection criteria for clerics to become chaplains, the status of chaplains in the chain of command, and their rights and duties in the armed forces, National Guard, and State Border Guard Service. The law prohibits priests of the UOC-MP from serving as chaplains on military bases or in conflict zones, which has drawn protest from the UOC-MP.

The law allows alternative nonmilitary service for conscientious objectors. The law does not exempt the clergy from military mobilization.

The law gives prison chaplains access to both pretrial detainees and sentenced inmates. It also protects the confidentiality of confession heard by prison chaplains, prohibits the use of information received during confession as evidence in legal proceedings, and does not allow the interrogation of clerics, interpreters, or other persons about matters associated with the confidentiality of confession.

Other rules and restrictions 
According to the constitution, organizers must notify local authorities in advance of any type of planned public gathering, and authorities may challenge the legality of the planned event. According to a 2016 Constitutional Court decision, religious organizations need only to inform local authorities of their intention to hold a public gathering, and need not apply for permission or notify authorities within a specific period in advance of the event.

The Office of the Parliamentary Human Rights Ombudsman is constitutionally required to release an annual report to parliament with a section on religious freedom.

The law restricts the activities of foreign-based religious groups and defines the permissible activities of noncitizen clergy, preachers, teachers, and other representatives of foreign-based religious organizations. By law foreign religious workers may “preach, administer religious ordinances, or practice other canonical activities,” but they may do so only for the religious organization that had invited them and with the approval of the government body that registered the statute of the organization. Missionary activity is included under permissible activities.

Education 
It is forbidden to teach religion as part of the mandatory public school curriculum and states public school training “shall be free from interference by political parties, civic and religious organizations.” Public schools include ethics of faith or similar faith-related courses as optional parts of the curriculum.

Religious groups are allowed to establish theological schools to train clergy and other religious workers, as well as seek state accreditation through the Ministry of Culture for their curriculum. The law states theological schools shall function based on their own statutes.

Government practices 
The government has banned clergy affiliated with the UOC-MP from serving as chaplains in the National Guard, referring to them as clerics from religious groups whose centers were “located in an aggressor state.”

Roman Catholics, UOC-KP members, UGCC members, and Muslims have reported instances of discrimination by the government.

Small religious groups report discriminatory treatment by local governments with regard to the allocation of land for religious buildings in Ivano-Frankivsk, Mykolayiv, Odessa, and Ternopil Oblasts as well as the City of Kyiv.

UGCC, UOC-MP, and Latter-Day Saints groups have reported difficulties in obtaining legal rights to property.

In 2015, the government of Volyn Oblast allowed the construction of a private industrial plant on the grounds of a Jewish cemetery. This was protested by the Union of Councils for Jews in the Former Soviet Union, and the national government ordered the government of Volyn Oblast to rectify the situation. As of the end of 2017, the plant is still operational.

Kyiv's Muslim community said the local government, which allocates land for cemeteries, had not acted on the community’s request for additional free land for Islamic burials, which was their legal right. Muslim community leaders said it was running out of land for it burials.

As part of implementing a 2015 decommunization and denazification law, several streets, buildings, and monuments have been renamed after 20th century Ukrainian nationalists, some of whom are associated with antisemitism.

Some members of parliament, such as Nadiya Savchenko have publicly used antisemitic rhetoric.

Societal attitudes 
As a consequence of the ongoing Russian military intervention in Ukraine, there have been disputes of religious jurisdiction between the UOC-MP and the UOC-KP, particularly in Eastern Ukraine.

Since 2013, there have been several instances of physical violence against Jews in Ukraine, some of which have been fatal. In one incident in 2017, three individuals threw a hand grenade at a group of Jews making pilgrimage to Uman. The grenade did not detonate, but caused injuries to a boy that was struck by it. Roughly 30,000 Jews travel to Uman each year for the Jewish New Year. According to a government spokesperson, the same three individuals also threw Molotov cocktails at a synagogue in Lviv (causing minor damage), and engaged in other attempted vandalism against Jewish buildings. The government claims that these individuals were primarily motivated to "smear Ukraine's reputation". In 2019, the independent National Minority Rights Monitoring Group reported no instances of violence against Jews and 14 cases of anti-Semitic vandalism. The NMRMG credited this improvement to an improvement in police response to anti-Semitic incidents. Some Jewish community leaders have continued to protest perceived impunity for cases of anti-Semitic conduct. Jewish community leaders have criticized the government's inaction over protection of historical landmarks with significance to the Jewish community.

According to a 2019 survey published by Pew Research, 83 percent of Ukrainians have favorable opinions of Jews, compared with 11 percent who have unfavorable attitudes, an increase in favorability since the prior study in 2009. A study by Razumkov found 17.4 percent of respondents had a favorable attitude towards Judaism, with 47.6 undecided indifferent, 22.3 percent undecided, 11 percent opposed, and 2 percent stating that they had never heard of the religion. These numbers also represent an increase in favorable attitudes over prior surveys conducted in 2018 and 2016.

Supporters of the far-right Ukrainian nationalist Freedom party have assaulted members of the UOC-MP and conducted vandalism against its property. The Freedom party also annually holds marches to commemorate Stepan Bandera's birthday, with thousands attending and some chanting antisemitic slogans.

Jehovah's Witnesses reported multiple incidences of assault against their membership. They have also expressed concern that the government has not prosecuted people accused of assaulting their members.

Members of the UOC-MP have disrupted religious ceremonies held by Protestant groups in public spaces, accusing them of "desecrating" the area.

In 2017, there were many reports of vandalism against public religious monuments and buildings of various denominations, but especially Jewish and Roman Catholic ones.

Territories not controlled by the Ukrainian government 
In Crimea, which has de facto been annexed by Russia, the Russian government has detained and imprisoned several Crimean Tatars on suspicion of affiliation with the Islamic fundamentalist group Hizb ut-Tahrir. Russian media frequently engages in denunciations against the UOC-KP and Jehovah's Witnesses, describing them as pro-fascist elements as part of a broader campaign to portray as fascist the pro-Ukrainian forces in the ongoing conflict between Russia and Ukraine.

Russia-backed forces in the internationally unrecognized Luhansk People's Republic and Donetsk People's Republic have detained and imprisoned members of the Jehovah’s Witnesses, and have confiscated several buildings belonging to the group. Representatives of Luhansk and Donetsk have repeatedly referred to Jehovah's Witnesses as "extremists" and "supporters of Neo-Nazi groups". The Luhansk People's Republic has implemented policies giving preference to the UOC-MP, and in particular discriminating against Protestant denominations.

According to Ukrainian media sources, in 2019 the authorities of the Donetsk People's Republic raided a mosque in Donetsk and confiscated religious materials under accusations of extremism, which the Ukrainian media and Ukrainian Muslim community described as false. Ukrainian security forces have also accused the Donetsk People's Republic of having paid agitators to vandalize UOC–MP properties with swastikas.

Religious group registration 
The Donetsk People's Republic oversees religious group registration in the territory that it controls, following a system that is independent from, but very similar to, that used by the Ukrainian government for the registration of religious organizations. The Luhansk People's Republic has instituted an "expert council" to screen and approve religious organizations.

References

Bibliography 

 Little, David (1991). Ukraine: The Legacy of Intolerance. US Institute of Peace Press. .

Further reading 
* Victor Yelensky (2008) RELIGIOUS FREEDOM: THE CASE OF UKRAINE, The Review of Faith & International Affairs, 6:2, 67-71, DOI: 10.1080/15570274.2008.9523341

Religion in Ukraine
Human rights in Ukraine
Religion in Russia
Human rights in Russia
Ukraine